James Byron Huggins (born August 14, 1959) is an American thriller writer currently being published by WildBlue Press.

Huggins has a bachelor's degree in journalism and English Literature from Troy State University,

Works 
 A Wolf Story (1993)
 The Reckoning (1994)
 Dark Visions (1995)
 Leviathan (1995)
 Cain (1997)
 Hunter (1999)
 Rora (2001)
 Nightbringer (2004)
 The Scam (2006)
 Sorcerer (2006)

References

External links 
 Biography on GoodReads
 Publisher WildBlue Press

1959 births
Living people
American male writers